Parakal is a village in Kottayam district in the state of Kerala in India.

Panchayats
Meenachil Thalul, Kummanam

References 
 villageinfo.in

Mandals in Kottayam district
Villages in Kottayam district